IFK Hässleholm is a Swedish football club from Hässleholm that was established in 1905. The team is currently playing in Division 2 Östra Götaland. Several well known players have played at the club including England international striker Peter Crouch as well as Swedish footballers Jon Jönsson, Andreas Dahl, and Tobias Linderoth. In recent years the club has played in Division 2, which is the fourth tier of the Swedish football league system. However, the club has played in second-tier football (Division 1 Södra and Division 2 Södra) in 1972–1974, 1975–81, 1987–1988, and 1992–1998.

Background
The club was first established by factory owners and football enthusiast Knut Rydlund in 1905. When the club first started, the team played at Linnaeus Flats until Göinge Vallen was built in 1910. During the 1910s, IFK Hässleholm was considered to be one of the best football clubs in Sweden In 1918, the team won the Scanian Championship.

By the 1920s, the team slid down into Division 2. The club was hurting financially and in 1928, the club had to take out loans. Over the years, the team has struggled to maintain its former glory. In the 1930s, the club added a handball team which was fairly successful. The handball team was outshining the football team at this point in time. However, World War II broke up the football team. Once the team resumed playing, it was no longer able to compete in Division 2. The franchise therefore focused on handball. In 1948, the handball side won the Scanian Championship but the team had disintegrated by 1980. Despite the initial success of handball, football once again made its way back to the top in the 1950s. The team successful landed back in the Division 2 again. In 1962, the franchise built a club house on Svedje Mark Street. With some success in the 1970s, the construction of a new playing facility was erected called Österås IP which has a capacity of 6,000. Following that, the club won the 1972 Skåne North East with players such as Bo Nilsson. In 1973, the team came in third place and in 1974 the team took part in their first qualifier.

The best years of the club were undoubtedly from 1991 to 1993. In 1991, the team returned to Division 1 and by 1993 nearly reached Allsvenskan. The team's success boosted crowds up to 8,500, 1,500 fans over capacity. In the year 2000 there was a dramatic change in the club after Peter Crouch and Alton Thelwell were loaned from Tottenham Hotspur. Their loan brought new attention to the club resulting in Jon Jönsson being signed by Spurs.

IFK Hässleholm are affiliated to the Skånes Fotbollförbund. Local rivals Hässleholms IF play in the same division.

In recent years, the club has been a base for many South African players coming to Sweden, to acclimatize them before moving on to other Swedish clubs. The most notable example is Tokelo Rantie in Malmö FF, but players such as May Mahlangu and Ayanda Nkili have also played here.

Season to season

Achievements

League
 Division 1 Södra:
 Runners-up (1): 1993

References

External links
 IFK Hässleholm – Official website

Football clubs in Skåne County
Association football clubs established in 1905
1905 establishments in Sweden
Idrottsföreningen Kamraterna